was viscount, admiral in the Imperial Japanese Navy, and 30th Prime Minister of Japan.

Makoto Saitō may also refer to:

, Japanese graphic designer 
, also known as K-ness., Japanese professional wrestler
, Japanese sport wrestler